Jorge Eliecer Banguero Viafára  (born October 4, 1974)
is a Colombian footballer. He plays as a defensive midfielder.

Banguero's former clubs include Millonarios, Deportes Tolima, Deportivo Pasto and Real Cartagena.

He played for the Colombia national football team at Copa America 2007.

References

External links

1974 births
Living people
Colombian footballers
Colombia international footballers
Categoría Primera A players
Categoría Primera B players
América de Cali footballers
Millonarios F.C. players
Deportes Tolima footballers
Deportivo Pasto footballers
Real Cartagena footballers
2007 Copa América players
Association football midfielders
Footballers from Cali